Colette Rosatti was a member of the Arizona House of Representatives from January 2003 until January 2007. She was first elected to the House in November 2002, representing the new re-districted District 8. She won re-election in 2004. She chose not to run for re-election to the House in 2006, instead challenging incumbent Carolyn S. Allen in the Republican primary for the Arizona State Senate.  She lost in the primary, and Allen went on to win re-election in the general election.

References

Women state legislators in Arizona
Republican Party members of the Arizona House of Representatives
Living people
Year of birth missing (living people)
Politicians from Detroit
21st-century American women